Lois Andrews (born Lorraine Gourley; March 24, 1924 – April 5, 1968) was an American actress who played in films during the 1940s and early 1950s.

She is perhaps best known for her first role in 1943 as the comic strip character Dixie Dugan in the Twentieth Century Fox film of the same name. Her husband, George Jessel, produced a number of films in which she had minor roles, including The Desert Hawk (1950), and Meet Me After the Show (1951).

Personal life 
Andrews was born in Huntington Park, California. While still in her teens, Andrews was married to Jessel from 1940 to 1943. They wed when she was 16, and they had a daughter, Jerilyn.

Her second marriage (October 27, 1945), to actor-singer David Street, was annulled in April 1946.

She was married to the actor Steve Brodie from October 14, 1946, until 1949. (Two newspaper articles say that she divorced Brodie March 3, 1949.)

Andrews married musician and actor Ernest Brunner in December 1952.

Death 
Andrews died of lung cancer at the age of 44.

Filmography 
 Meet Me After the Show (1951) as Gloria Carstairs
 The Desert Hawk (1950) as Maznah
 Rustlers (1949) as Trixie Fontaine
 Western Heritage (1948) as Cleo Raymond
 Roger Touhy, Gangster (1944) as Daisy
 Dixie Dugan (1943) as Dixie Dugan

References

External links 

American film actresses
Actresses from Los Angeles
1924 births
1968 deaths
Burials at Forest Lawn Memorial Park (Hollywood Hills)
Deaths from lung cancer in California
People from Huntington Park, California
20th-century American actresses